Trachyglanis ineac is a species of loach catfish endemic to the Democratic Republic of the Congo where it is found in the Congo, Tshuapa, Lomela and Lomami Rivers.  It grows to a length of 10.1 cm.

References 
 

Amphiliidae
Endemic fauna of the Democratic Republic of the Congo
Taxa named by Max Poll
Fish described in 1954